Farmmi is a company that processes and sells agricultural products in China and abroad; it grows and markets shiitake and wood ear mushrooms and other edible fungi products, including bamboo fungi, chestnut mushroom, trumpet royale, hen of the woods, lawyer's wig, and lion's mane mushroom. It also operates Farmmi Jicai, an online store that sells edible fungi products under the Forasen and Farmmi Liangpin brands. In addition, the company exports dried whole and sliced shiitake mushrooms, and dried black fungus to Israel. Through its distributors, it offers its products to restaurants, cafeterias, and local specialty stores.

References

External links

Food and drink companies of China
2003 establishments in China
Chinese brands
Multinational companies headquartered in China
Companies listed on the Nasdaq
2018 initial public offerings